Eric Eidsness may refer to:

 Eric Eidsness (politician) (born 1944), American political figure
 Eric Eidsness (American football), American football coach in the United States